Ochira railway station (code: OCR) is an 'NSG 6 category' railway station, situated near the city of Kollam in Kollam district of Kerala. Ochira railway station is situated at the borders of Kollam district. It falls under the Thiruvananthapuram railway division of the Southern Railway zone, Indian Railways. The nearest important major rail head is Kollam Junction railway station. The other major railway stations near Ochira are Kayamkulam Junction railway station and Karunagappalli railway station.

Significance
Ochira is well connected with various cities in India like Kollam, Trivandrum, Kochi, Thrissur, Kottayam through Indian Railways. It is the nearest railway station to Oachira Parabrahma Temple, which is an extremely ancient temple located at the borders of Kollam district. Ochira railway station is under the list of Indian Railways to be developed as world class railway stations along with other 11 Kerala railway stations.|

Services
Passenger trains having halt at Ochira railway station.

See also
 Kollam Junction railway station
 Karunagappalli railway station
 Kayamkulam Junction railway station
 Paravur railway station

References

Ochira
Thiruvananthapuram railway division
Railway stations opened in 1958
1958 establishments in Kerala